Fateh Bahadur Singh commonly known as Fateh Bahadur Kushwaha is a member of Bihar Legislative Assembly for the 17th Bihar Assembly. He was elected as a candidate of Rashtriya Janata Dal  from the Dehri Assembly constituency of Rohtas district. In the 2020 Assembly elections, he defeated Satyanarayan Singh of Bhartiya Janata Party, who was his nearest political rival.

Political career
Singh, who was a businessman in his earlier life, was aspiring for ticket from Upendra Kushwaha's Rashtriya Lok Samata Party's to contest from Dehri Assembly constituency in 2015 . However, in 2015 Bihar Assembly elections, he was denied the ticket by the party. In 2019, the by-polls were conducted in the Dehri constituency, to fill the vacancy arising out of the revokation of the membership of Muhammad Ilyas Hussain in Bihar Legislative Assembly. Hussain was convicted in a corruption case and the Bhartiya Janata Party's candidate Satyanarayan Singh defeated the another candidate, Mohammad Firoz Husain placed by Rashtriya Janata Dal.

In 2022 assembly elections, Fateh Bahadur Singh defeated Satyanarayan Singh Yadav with a margin of 464 votes. The nearest runner-up, Yadav got 63,721 votes.

In 2023, there was a raid by Income Tax Department on the Hotel owned by Singh. It was said to be a statewide exercise ran by IT Department to clean up the administration.

Controversies
He was also in controversy involving the chief councillor, Vishaka Singh; latter was accused of framing fake caste certificate of herself belonging to Extremely Backward Caste, for political gains. However, Singh had lodged a complaint against her with the District Magistrate of Rohtas in connection with the same.

References

Rashtriya Janata Dal politicians
Living people
Bihar MLAs 2020–2025